This is a list of the heads of state of India, from the independence of India in 1947 to the present day. The current head of state of India is Droupadi Murmu, elected in 2022 after being nominated by the National Democratic Alliance and its leading party the Bharatiya Janata Party, the largest party in the parliament and the party led by Prime Minister Narendra Modi.

From 1947 to 1950, the head of state under the Indian Independence Act 1947 was King of India, who was also the monarch of the United Kingdom and of the other Dominions of the British Commonwealth. The monarch was represented in India by a governor-general. India became a republic under the Constitution of 1950 and the monarch and governor-general were replaced by a ceremonial president.

Monarch (1947–1950)

Monarch
The succession to the throne was the same as the succession to the British throne.

Governor-General
The Governor-General was the representative of the Monarch in India and exercised most of the powers of the Monarch. The Governor-General was appointed for an indefinite term, serving at the pleasure of the Monarch. After the passage of the Statute of Westminster 1931, the Governor-General was appointed solely on the advice of the Cabinet of India without the involvement of the British government. In the event of a vacancy the Chief Justice served as Officer Administering the Government.

President of India
Under the Constitution, of the Republic of India, the president replaced the monarch as ceremonial head of state. The president is elected by the Electoral College for a five-year term. In the event of a vacancy, the vice president serves as acting president.

Status

Standards

Living former heads of state

References

External links
 World Statesmen – India
 Rulers.org – India

India
Lists of political office-holders in India
India government-related lists